Acrolophus chloropelta is a type of insect, moth of the family Acrolophidae. It is found in Brazil.

References

chloropelta
Moths described in 1928